San Basilio Mottola is a closed railway station in San Basilio, Italy. The station was located on the Bari–Taranto railway.

Due to upgrading of the route, the line was doubled and realigned, which meant that a number of towns and villages were left without a railway station.

Train services
The station was served by the following service(s):

Local services (Treno regionale) Bari - Gioia del Colle - Taranto

References

Railway stations in Apulia
Railway stations closed in 1997
Buildings and structures in the Province of Taranto